The Luanginga is a river rising in Angola, which flows into the Zambezi in western Zambia.

Location

External links 
 https://www.flickr.com/photos/36032475@N07/3642660837
 https://zambianeye.com/dredging-of-luanginga-river-to-open-up-trade-between-kalabo-and-angola/

References 

Rivers of Angola
Rivers of Zambia
Tributaries of the Zambezi River
International rivers of Africa